In mathematics, an ordered exponential field is an ordered field together with a function which generalises the idea of exponential functions on the ordered field of real numbers.

Definition
The ordered field  together with the additional function  is called an ordered exponential field.

Examples
 The canonical example for an ordered exponential field is the ordered field of real numbers R with any function of the form  where  is a real number greater than 1. It was proved in the 1990s that Rexp is model complete, a result known as Wilkie's theorem. This result, when combined with Khovanskiĭ's theorem on pfaffian functions, proves that Rexp is also o-minimal. Alfred Tarski posed the question of the decidability of Rexp and hence it is now known as Tarski's exponential function problem. It is known that if the real version of Schanuel's conjecture is true then Rexp is decidable.
 The ordered field of surreal numbers  admits an exponential which extends the exponential function exp on R. Since  does not have the Archimedean property, this is an example of a non-Archimedean ordered exponential field.
 The ordered field of logarithmic-exponential transseries  is constructed specifically in a way such that it admits a canonical exponential.

Formally exponential fields
A formally exponential field, also called an exponentially closed field, is an ordered field that can be equipped with an exponential . For any formally exponential field , one can choose an exponential  on  such that 
 for some natural number .

Properties
This is so because  for all . 
 Consequently, every ordered exponential field is a Euclidean field. 
 Consequently, every ordered exponential field is an ordered Pythagorean field.
 Not every real-closed field is a formally exponential field, e.g., the field of real algebraic numbers does not admit an exponential.
 Consequently, the class of formally exponential fields is not an elementary class since the field of real numbers and the field of real algebraic numbers are elementarily equivalent structures. 
 The class of formally exponential fields is a pseudoelementary class.

See also
 Exponential field

Notes

References
 
 

Model theory
Field (mathematics)
Algebraic structures
Exponentials